I'm Beginning to See the Light is an acoustic jazz album by American mandolinist David Grisman, British guitarist Martin Taylor, George Marsh, and Jim Kerwin.

Track listing 
 I'm Beginning to See the Light (Duke Ellington, Don George, Johnny Hodges, Harry James) – 4:00
 Autumn Leaves (Joseph Kosma, Johnny Mercer, Jacques Prévert) – 4:22
 Do You Know What It Means (To Miss New Orleans?) (Louis Alter, Eddie DeLange) – 5:11
 East of the Sun (Brooks Bowman) – 4:43
 Autumn in New York (Vernon Duke) – 4:40
 Makin' Whoopee (Walter Donaldson, Gus Kahn) – 5:11
 Lover Man (Jimmy Davis, Roger Ramirez, Jimmy Sherman) – 5:27
 Exactly Like You (Jimmy McHugh, Dorothy Fields) – 4:02
 Willow Weep for Me (Ann Ronell) – 7:05
 A Foggy Day (George Gershwin, Ira Gershwin) – 4:19
 Cheek to Cheek (Irving Berlin) – 5:09
 Bewitched, Bothered and Bewildered (Richard Rodgers, Lorenz Hart) – 5:10

Personnel
 David Grisman – mandolin, mandola, mandocello, guitar, tenor guitar
 Martin Taylor – guitar
 Jim Kerwin – double bass
 George Marsh – drums

References

1999 albums
David Grisman albums
Acoustic Disc albums